The Philharmonia Baroque Orchestra (PBO) is an American orchestra based in San Francisco.  PBO is dedicated to historically informed performance of Baroque, Classical and Romantic music on original instruments.  The orchestra performs its subscription series in the following cities and venues:
 San Francisco: Herbst Theatre
 Berkeley: First Congregational Church of Berkeley
 Stanford: Bing Concert Hall
 Palo Alto: First United Methodist Church

History
Laurette Goldberg, a harpsichordist, teacher, and pupil of Gustav Leonhardt, founded the PBO in 1981.  She stood down as the ensemble's music director in 1985 and chose Nicholas McGegan as her successor.  McGegan served as PBO music director from 1985 through 2020. During McGegan's tenure, the Philharmonia Chorale was established in 1995 as the affiliated chorus with the PBO, under the direction of Bruce Lamott.  McGegan now has the title of music director laureate with the PBO.

In 2012, Richard Egarr first guest-conducted the PBO.  Following two additional guest appearances, in January 2019, the PBO announced the appointment of Egarr as its next Music Director, with an initial contract of 5 years.  The original intention was for Egarr to serve as music director designate for the 2020-2021 season, and then to take the title of music director with the 2021-2022 season.  In the wake of the COVID-19 pandemic, the PBO reconfigured its 2020-2021 season into a virtual season, and announced the advent of Egarr as its music director effective 1 July 2020, one season earlier than originally planned.

Collaborations
The PBO has collaborated with such arts organisations as Cal Performances, the Centre de Musique Baroque de Versailles, and the New York Baroque Dance Company in the fully staged, modern-day premiere of Rameau's Le Temple de la Gloire in April 2017. PBO regularly partners with the Mark Morris Dance Group.

Recordings and Media
The PBO has commercially recorded for such labels as Harmonia Mundi, Reference Recordings and BMG and Avie.  The ensemble initiated its own label, Philharmonia Baroque Productions, in 2011.  On radio, the PBO has been regularly featured on KDFC-FM.

Honors and awards
 1991 - Grammy Award, Best Choral Performance (Other than Opera)], Handel: Susana)
 1991 - Gramophone Award for Baroque Vocal, Handel: Susana)
 2004 - "Ensemble of the Year" by Musical America.
 2012 - GRAMMY nomination for Best Orchestral Performance (Haydn: Symphonies 104, 88 & 101)

Music directors
 Laurette Goldberg (1981–1985)
 Nicholas McGegan (1985–2020)
 Richard Egarr (2020–present)

References

External links
 Official website of the Philharmonia Baroque Orchestra

Early music orchestras
Musical groups established in 1981
Musical groups from San Francisco
Choirs in the San Francisco Bay Area
Orchestras based in California